Junagadh Junction railway station is a railway station serving Junagadh town, in Junagadh district of Gujarat state of India. It is under Bhavnagar railway division of Western Railway zone of Indian Railways.

, a single diesel broad-gauge railway line exists at this station; twenty-five trains halt here, two trains originate and two trains terminate here.

Trains

The following trains halt at Junagadh Junction railway station:

 22991/92 Bandra Terminus–Veraval Superfast Express
 19569/70 Rajkot–Veraval Express
 16333/34 Thiruvananthapuram–Veraval Express
 11087/88 Veraval–Pune Express
 19319/20 Veraval–Indore Mahamana Express
 22957/58 Somnath Superfast Express
 11465/66 Somnath–Jabalpur Express (via Bina)
 11463/64 Somnath–Jabalpur Express (via Itarsi)
 19119/20 Ahmedabad–Somnath Intercity Express
 19251/52 Somnath–Okha Express

References

Railway stations in Junagadh district
Bhavnagar railway division
Railway junction stations in Gujarat